Suicidal tendencies is the propensity for a person to have suicidal ideation or to make suicide attempts. It may also refer to:

Entertainment 
 Suicidal Tendencies, a band that was founded in Venice, Los Angeles, California, in 1981 by the leader and only permanent member, singer Mike Muir
 Suicidal Tendencies (album), Suicidal Tendencies' debut studio album 
 "Suicidal Tendencies" (Arrow), an episode of Arrow

Psychosociology 
 Suicide, the act of a human being intentionally causing their own death
 Suicidal person, a person who is experiencing a suicide crisis, and is contemplating, attempting or seeking a means to commit suicide
 Suicide crisis, a situation in which a person is attempting to kill him or herself or is seriously contemplating or planning to do so
 Suicidal ideation, a common medical term for thoughts about suicide, which may be as detailed as a formulated plan, without the suicidal act itself
 Parasuicide, refers to suicide attempts or gestures and self-harm where there is no actual intention to die, indicator for a successful future suicide
 Suicide attempt, an attempt at suicide that failed either by chance, ineffective means or by design, indicator for a successful future suicide

See also
 :Category:Suicide